The 20 cm leichter Ladungswerfer (20 cm leLdgW) was a spigot mortar used by Germany during World War II. It was used by engineers to demolish obstacles and strongpoints. It was gradually withdrawn from front-line service from 1942.

Propellant was placed at the top of the spigot and ignited when the projectile slid far enough down the spigot to complete the circuit. It fired HE (high explosive) and smoke rounds in addition to a special Harpunengeschosse (harpoon bomb) that carried a rope with hooks to clear mines or wire obstacles.

External links 
 mortar page from TM-E 30-451 Handbook on German Military Forces on Lone Sentry
 Allied intelligence report on Lone Sentry

Sources
 Gander, Terry and Chamberlain, Peter. Weapons of the Third Reich: An Encyclopedic Survey of All Small Arms, Artillery and Special Weapons of the German Land Forces 1939-1945. New York: Doubleday, 1979 

Spigot mortars
World War II mortars of Germany
Weapons and ammunition introduced in 1940